Tanc Sade (born 28 July 1980) is an Australian actor, writer and director. Sade worked in several theater productions in Australia before landing a recurring role on Gilmore Girls in 2005.

Early life
Sade was born in Sydney, New South Wales, Australia. He worked in the theatre before moving to the United States.

Career

Sade rose to international attention playing the quirky role of "Finn" in the cult series Gilmore Girls. Producer Amy Sherman-Palladino created the role after he auditioned for the role of love interest Logan Huntzberger. He starred in the series Roadies, the one-hour drama written and directed by Cameron Crowe and produced by J. J. Abrams for Showtime, which lasted for one season.

Sade played Alec Holester in Matador. The action series, from executive producers Roberto Orci and Alex Kurtzman which debuted in July 2014 on Robert Rodriguez's new cable network and is composed of 13 hour-long episodes. He recently starred in Childhood's End based on the Arthur C. Clarke novel of the same name.

Sade starred opposite Nicolas Cage in the movie Stolen and has appeared on Sons of Anarchy, The Mentalist, Body of Proof, 90210, CSI: Miami, and CSI: NY. He wrote and directed Flowers and Weeds starring Academy Award Nominee and Golden Globe winner, Terence Stamp, and music from Academy Award winner Glen Hansard.

Athletic career
In 2012 Sade broke the Australian National Dynamic Freediving record by swimming  on a single breath of air. He was later crowned Australian National champion of the same year.

Filmography

Film

Television

References

External links
 
 Five Island Films

1980 births
Living people
Australian male film actors
Australian male television actors
Male actors from Sydney